"Away" is the first single released from Spanish singer-songwriter Enrique Iglesias' Greatest Hits album. The song features vocals from American pop-rap singer-songwriter Sean Garrett. The single was released on 11 November 2008. "Away" was originally intended to be on Sean Garrett's debut solo album "Turbo 919", but the decision was made to include it on Iglesias' album instead. The song debuted on the UK Singles Chart, at number 132 on the week of the physical single release.

Music video
The video was directed by Anthony Mandler. The video premiered on TRL on 12 November 2008. The video features a cameo by Sean Garrett. In the video, Iglesias is seen walking through the desert, looking back at the horrible crash in which he has died while his girlfriend, played by Niki Huey, cries hysterically.  Most of the video was shot in the desert.

Track listing
 UK CD single
 "Away" (Edit) – 3:48
 "Away" (Moto Blanco Club Mix) – 7:48

 UK digital download
 "Away" (Edit) – 3:48
 "Miss You" (featuring Nâdiya) – 3:55
 "Away" (Music Video) – 4:38

Charts

Year-end charts

See also
List of number-one dance singles of 2009 (U.S.)

References

2008 singles
Enrique Iglesias songs
Music videos directed by Anthony Mandler
Pop ballads
Contemporary R&B ballads
Songs written by Sean Garrett
Songs written by Enrique Iglesias
2008 songs
Interscope Records singles